The 2007-08 Top 14 Competition was a French domestic rugby union club competition, operated by the Ligue Nationale de Rugby (LNR). Because France hosted the 2007 Rugby World Cup, the competition did not begin at its normal time of August, but instead started on the last weekend in October 2007, one week after the Rugby World Cup final. The league compensated for the late start by playing on several weekends that it normally skips, namely the weekends of the 2008 Six Nations Championship and the semifinals and final of the 2007-08 Heineken Cup. The season ended on June 28, 2008, with Toulouse defeating regular-season league leader Clermont 26–20 in the final and thereby lifting the Bouclier de Brennus.

This year's edition of the Top 14 welcomed Auch and Dax, who earned promotion from Rugby Pro D2. Agen and Narbonne were relegated from the Top 14.

As in previous seasons, the top four clubs at the end of the home-and-away season advanced to a single-elimination playoff. The semifinals were held at neutral sites, with the final at Stade de France. Going into the season, the top six clubs were guaranteed of berths in the 2008-09 Heineken Cup. Since Toulouse advanced to the 2007-08 Heineken Cup final against Irish club Munster, thereby assuring a higher finish for a French team in that competition than for any team from England or Italy, the seventh-place club also earned a berth in the 2008-09 Heineken Cup. The bottom two teams were provisionally relegated to Pro D2, with the possibility of one or both of the bottom teams to be reprieved if a team above them failed a postseason financial audit. This happened in 2007-08, as Albi failed the audit, ultimately giving a reprieve to second-from bottom Dax.

This season, LNR trialled a modification to the bonus point system in both the Top 14 and Pro D2. The system to be used this season was:

4 points for a win.
2 points for a draw.
1 "bonus" point for winning while scoring at least 3 more tries than the opponent. This replaces the standard bonus point for scoring 4 tries regardless of the match result.
1 "bonus" point for losing by 7 points (or less).

This system was explicitly intended to prevent a losing team from earning two bonus points, as is possible under the standard system.

 Second division: 2007-08 Rugby Pro D2 season

Teams

Number of teams by regions

Table

Fixtures & Results

Round 1

Round 2

Round 3

Round 4

Round 5

Round 6

Round 7

Round 8

Round 9

Round 10

Round 11

Round 12

Round 13

Round 14

Round 15

Round 16

Round 17

Round 18

Round 19 

Game postponed due to Toulouse playing in Heineken Cup semi-finals on the same date.  Game to be rescheduled for 7 May 2008.

Round 20

Round 19 (rescheduled game)

Rescheduled from 26 April 2008.

Round 21

Round 22

Round 23 

Game postponed due to Toulouse playing in Heineken Cup final on the same date.  Game to be rescheduled for 3 June 2008.

Round 24

Round 23 (rescheduled game)

Rescheduled from 24 May 2008.

Round 25

Round 26

Knock-out stages

Semi-finals

Final

Leading scorers
 Note that points scorers includes tries as well as conversions, penalties and drop goals.

Top points scorers

Top try scorers

Attendances

The league has seen a major increase in attendance in recent years. In 2006-07, per-game attendance averaged 10,549, up from 9,288 in 2005-06 and 7,255 in 2004-05, when the league consisted of 16 teams instead of its current 14. The 2005-06 and 2006-07 totals are skewed to some degree because Stade Français drew over 79,000 fans to each of the two fixtures they played at Stade de France in both seasons. However, even if the Stade de France fixtures are not included, per-game attendance was 8,549 in 2005-06 and 9,267 in 2006-07, both well above the 2004-05 figures.

The final average attendance for the 2007-08 regular season was 11,106, another increase from the previous season. The LNR also reported that league-wide season ticket sales were up by 11% from 2006-07. The most-attended matches were the three Stade Français matches played at Stade de France, each of which drew more than 75,000, and Toulouse's three games at Stadium Municipal, each of which drew at least 30,000.

 Attendances do not include the semi-finals or final as these are at neutral venues.

See also
 2007-08 Heineken Cup
 2007-08 Rugby Pro D2 season

Notes

References

  "Ligue Nationale de Rugby". lnr.fr. Accessed August 13, 2007.

External links
  Ligue Nationale de Rugby - Official website
 Top 14 on Planetrugby.com

Top 14 seasons
 
France